Raceway Park, was a 1/4 mile Asphalt oval race track located near Valleyfair in Shakopee, Minnesota. Raceway Park was sanctioned by NASCAR Home Tracks It earlier was a dirt track. The track announced on its Facebook page that it was permanently closing after the 2013 season on September 1, 2013.

Divisions
Super Late Models, Hobby Stocks, Short Trackers, Bombers, Figure 8s, Mini Stocks, Front Wheel Flyers, bus racing, and demolition derby, Flag Pole.

Traveling series
The ASA Midwest Tour held events at the track. The track has held Mid-American Stock Car Series events in their now-defunct Super Truck division. The NASCAR Midwest Series ran two races at the track, between 2005 and 2006.

See also
2008 Shakopee 100

References

External links
Raceway Park race results at Racing-Reference

Buildings and structures in Scott County, Minnesota
Sports venues in Minnesota
Motorsport venues in Minnesota
NASCAR tracks
Tourist attractions in Scott County, Minnesota
Defunct motorsport venues in the United States
2013 disestablishments in Minnesota
1954 establishments in Minnesota
Sports venues completed in 1954